Eric Hughes may refer to:
Eric Hughes (cypherpunk), American mathematician and cypherpunk
Eric Hughes (rugby, born 1950), English rugby union and rugby league player
Eric Hughes (rugby league, born 1913) (1913–2012), Australian rugby league player
Eric Hughes (basketball), American basketball coach
Eric Brian Hughes (born 1968), American film director